Farook College is a government-aided, autonomous, arts and science college located in Feroke near Calicut, Kerala, India. It is the largest residential post-graduate aided institution in Kerala affiliated to the University of Calicut; it was granted autonomous college status in 2015.

Established in 1948, Farook College has been identified by the University Grants Commission of India as a College with Potential for Excellence (CPE), the first college under Calicut Universities to receive the status. It was accredited by NAAC at 5-star level in 2002 and re-accredited at A+ in 2016. It is the winner of Moulana Azad National Literacy Award, R. Sanker Award (two times) for the best first-grade college in the state and the winner of a campus award of University of Calicut among Arts and Science colleges.
College ranked 71 in All India Ranking by National Institutional Ranking Framework during 2019.

Location 

The college is on a hillock near the Sales Tax Checkpost at Feroke-Chungam on Chaliyar river 5 km from Feroke Railway Station, 14 km from the city of Calicut and at a distance of 16 km from Calicut Airport.

The entire campus comprising the college, its hostels, the staff quarters and its sister concerns covers an area of 72 acres. The entire village is popularly called 'Farook College' and has a post office called 'Farook College'.

The name of the village was 'Iru-mooli-Parambu' or the 'land of the humming wind' but the locals started calling the place 'Farook College Town' once the college started functioning in 1948. Today the village looks like a township with several colleges, schools and training organizations.

History
The college was founded by the Rouzathul Uloom Association led by Moulavi Abussabah Ahmed Ali. The college came under the University of Kerala in 1957 and under the University of Calicut in 1968.

The college built the Raja Gate in 1961 and added an indoor stadium in 1976. The Abussabah Library Complex was inaugurated in 2002 and the Digital Library was commissioned in 2009. The college added the Diamond Jubilee Block in 2013 which has since been used as the post-graduate block and the research block in 2016.

Programmes

Farook college offers programmes in various disciplines viz. 21 undergraduate, 16 postgraduate and 11 research programmes.

Undergraduate programmes

English, Malayalam, Economics, Sociology, Arabic, Mathematics, Physics, Chemistry, Statistics, Computer Science, Botany, Zoology, Commerce, Business Administration, Psychology, Commerce, Functional English, Multimedia Communication, Library and Information Science, B.Voc. Information Technology (software development), and B.Voc Automobile.

PhD programmes
Arabic, English, Physics, Chemistry, Zoology, Mathematics, Statistics, Economics, Computer Science, Commerce and History.

Postgraduate programmes

English, Arabic, Economics, History, Mathematics, Statistics, Computer Science, Physics, Chemistry, Zoology, Commerce, Library and Information Science, Journalism and Mass Communication and Psychology.

Facilities
 Abussabah Library (Central Library, Farook College): About 90,000 volumes, about 200 journals etc. It is a two-storied building with 27,000 sq. feet area, with digital library, talking book library, Braille section, textbook library, reference section, PG section, career corner, newspaper reading section etc.
 PM Institute for Civil Service Examinations
 Jubilee Health Center
 Yusuf Al-Saqar Auditorium with a capacity of 1000
 Hajee AP Bava Convention centre with a capacity of 2200
 Audio Visual Theatre (AVT)
 Kerala State Centre for Assistive Technology (KSCAT), the only centre in the country to train the differently abled students

Sports and games

Farook college plays a prominent role in developing and promoting sports in the Malabar region. Provisions are made by the department for games including football, cricket, table tennis, handball, baseball, softball, basketball, volleyball and badminton.

There is a well-designed indoor stadium in the college, the only one of its kind under the Calicut University, 400-metre eight-track lane playground, turfed football ground, basketball court, physical fitness centre, etc.

International badminton stars like V. Diju, Arun Vishnu, Ram C. Vijay, Midhilesh Sunder and others were the players of Farook College.

College's football team participates in Kerala district leagues, with best result of reaching Kerala Premier League Qualifiers.

Sister organizations

 Farook Institute of Management Studies 
 Rouzathul Uloom Arabic College
 Farook Training College
 Al-Farook Educational Center
 Alfarook Residential School
 Farook Higher Secondary School
 Farook LP School
 Farook Teacher Training Institute

Notable alumni 

 Bahadoor,  Indian actor
 T. V. Chandran, film director
 T. Damodaran film director 
 T. K. Hamza, former Minister and MP
 Purushan Kadalundy, MLA
 Akbar Kakkattil, Indian short-story writer and novelist
 K. A. Jayaseelan, poet, essayist, linguist
 Najeeb Kanthapuram, MLA
 P. K. Kunhalikutty, MP
 Shafi Parambil, MLA
 Thalappil Pradeep, scientist
 P. T. A. Rahim, MLA
 P. A. Mohammed Riyas, Minister of PWD and Tourism
 M. P. Abdussamad Samadani, former MP and MLA
 Sithara, singer
 V. R. Sudheesh, writer

Farook College township

The township around the college is also called Farook College town. There are a few restaurants, bookstalls and cool bars mainly catering to the students of its colleges and schools. There are around five mosques and two temples in the campus. Private buses conduct dedicated trips to the college throughout the day. The nearest bigger town is called Ramanattukara Junction at a distance of three kilometres. Calicut city is 15 kilometres away.

Image gallery

See also

References

External links 

Farook College Nostalgia, Video in Malayalam, 3 Minutes
University of Calicut
University Grants Commission
National Assessment and Accreditation Council

Colleges affiliated with the University of Calicut
Arts and Science colleges in Kerala
Universities and colleges in Kozhikode
1948 establishments in India
Educational institutions established in 1948
Kozhikode south
Academic institutions formerly affiliated with the University of Madras